The 1927 Stanley Cup playoffs were held from March 29 to April 13, 1927, to determine the championship of the National Hockey League (NHL) and the Stanley Cup. In the first Stanley Cup Final with two NHL teams, the Ottawa Senators defeated the Boston Bruins 2–0–2 in a best-of-five series.

Playoff format
With the collapse of the Western Hockey League, the Stanley Cup became the championship trophy of the NHL. The NHL teams now battled out amongst themselves for the coveted Cup. The new division alignment and the new playoff format also meant that an American team was guaranteed to be the first American NHL team to make the Cup Finals.

The division winners received a bye to the second round. The second-place and third-place finishers played a two-game, total-goals series to advance to the second round. The second-place Montreal Canadiens and Boston Bruins both advanced to the second round. The Canadiens lost to the first-place Ottawa Senators, while the Bruins upset the first-place New York Rangers to set up the Final. Ties were not broken using overtime. After two ties in the Final, NHL president Frank Calder capped the Final at four games and neither team won three games of the best-of-final. Ottawa won two to Boston's none and the series ended on April 13 with Ottawa the winner.

Playoff bracket

Quarterfinals

(C2) Montreal Canadiens vs. (C3) Montreal Maroons

(A2) Boston Bruins vs. (A3) Chicago Black Hawks

Game one of this series was played in New York.

Semifinals

(C1) Ottawa Senators vs. (C2) Montreal Canadiens

(A1) New York Rangers vs. (A2) Boston Bruins

Stanley Cup Finals

Playoff scoring leaders
Note: GP = Games played; G = Goals; A = Assists; Pts = Points

See also
 1926–27 NHL season

References

playoffs
Stanley Cup playoffs